Esztergom County was an administrative county of the Kingdom of Hungary, situated on both sides of the Danube river. Its territory is now divided between Hungary and Slovakia. The territory to the north of the Danube is part of Slovakia, while the territory to the south of the Danube is part of Hungary.

Geography

Its territory comprised a 15 km strip to the west of the lower part of the Garam river and continued some 10 km south of the Danube river. Its area was 1076 km² around 1910.

Capitals
The capital of the county was the Esztergom Castle and the town of Esztergom, then from 1543 onwards, when the territory became part of the Ottoman Empire, the county officials fled to Nagyszombat and Érsekújvár, the latter functioning as a seat (e. g. 1605–1663) and finally since 1714 the previous situation was restored.

History
A predecessor of the county existed as early as in the 9th century, when Esztergom was one of the most important castles of Great Moravia. The Esztergom county as a comitatus arose at the end of the 10th century as one of the first comitatus of the Kingdom of Hungary. The county had a special status in that since 1270 its heads were at the same time the archbishops of Esztergom.

In the aftermath of World War I, the part of Esztergom county north of the Danube became part of newly formed Czechoslovakia, as recognized by the concerned states in 1920 by the Treaty of Trianon. The southern part remained in Hungary and merged with the southern part of Komárom county to form Komárom-Esztergom County in 1923. 

Following the provisions of the First Vienna Award, the Czechoslovak part became again part of Hungary in November 1938. The old Esztergom county was recreated. After World War II, the Trianon borders were reestablished and Komárom-Esztergom County was recreated again. In 1950, it was renamed to Komárom county and received some additional territories. This county was eventually was renamed to Komárom-Esztergom county again in 1990. The part of the county north of the river Danube is now in Slovakia and is part of the Nitra region.

Demographics

In 1900, the county had a population of 87,651 people and was composed of the following linguistic communities:

Total:

 Hungarian: 69,429 (79,2%)
 German: 9,995 (11,4%)
 Slovak: 7,491 (8,6%)
 Croatian: 61 (0,1%)
 Serbian: 15 (0,0%)
 Romanian: 7 (0,0%)
 Ruthenian: 1 (0,0%)
 Other or unknown: 652 (0,7%)

According to the census of 1900, the county was composed of the following religious communities:

Total:

 Roman Catholic: 74,017 (84,4%)
 Calvinist: 9,829 (11,2%)
 Jewish: 2,974 (3,4%)
 Lutheran: 733 (0,8%)
 Greek Catholic: 54 (0,1%)
 Greek Orthodox: 33 (0,1%)
 Unitarian: 6 (0,0%)
 Other or unknown: 5 (0,0%)

Subdivisions
In the early 20th century, the subdivisions of Esztergom county were:

 

Štúrovo and Mužla are now in Slovakia.

References

States and territories established in 1690
States and territories established in 1790
States and territories established in 1938
1543 disestablishments
1786 disestablishments
States and territories disestablished in 1920
States and territories disestablished in 1923
States and territories disestablished in 1945
Esztergom
Divided regions
Counties in the Kingdom of Hungary